Bothrops pubescens is a species of venomous snake in the  family Viperidae. It is found in Brazil and Uruguay.
The diet is comprised small mammals (56.2 percent of individual prey found, anurans (21.2%), lizards (7.5%), birds(5.0%). Also, prey to predator mass ratio ranged from 0.002 to 0.627. They tend to live in disturbed areas and mainly those close to forest.

References

2. Hartmann, Marília T., et al. “Feeding Habits and Habitat Use in Bothrops Pubescens (Viperidae, 
Crotalinae) from Southern Brazil.” Journal of Herpetology, vol. 39, no. 4, 2005, pp. 664–667. JSTOR, www.jstor.org/stable/4092860.

pubescens
Reptiles described in 1870
Taxa named by Edward Drinker Cope